Kuratau is a small village north of Pukawa, on the western side of New Zealand's Lake Taupō. 

The Kuratau Power Station was built on the Kuratau River near the town and completed in 1962.

The local Poukura Marae and Parekawa meeting house is a meeting place of the Ngāti Tūwharetoa hapū of Ngāti Parekāwa.

Demographics
The settlement is part of the larger Lake Taupo Bays statistical area.

Kuratau had a population of 93 at the 2018 New Zealand census, unchanged since the 2013 census, and an increase of 6 people (6.9%) since the 2006 census. There were 60 households, comprising 48 males and 48 females, giving a sex ratio of 1.0 males per female. The median age was 64.8 years (compared with 37.4 years nationally), with 6 people (6.5%) aged under 15 years, 6 (6.5%) aged 15 to 29, 39 (41.9%) aged 30 to 64, and 45 (48.4%) aged 65 or older.

Ethnicities were 93.5% European/Pākehā, 6.5% Māori, and 6.5% other ethnicities. People may identify with more than one ethnicity.

Although some people chose not to answer the census's question about religious affiliation, 38.7% had no religion, 51.6% were Christian, and 3.2% had Māori religious beliefs.

Of those at least 15 years old, 27 (31.0%) people had a bachelor's or higher degree, and 12 (13.8%) people had no formal qualifications. The median income was $38,000, compared with $31,800 nationally. 18 people (20.7%) earned over $70,000 compared to 17.2% nationally. The employment status of those at least 15 was that 33 (37.9%) people were employed full-time, and 12 (13.8%) were part-time.

Education

References

Taupō District
Populated places in Waikato
Populated places on Lake Taupō